Fossli Provincial Park is a provincial park in British Columbia, Canada, located on Stirling Arm of Sproat Lake on Vancouver Island. The 52-hectare park, west of Port Alberni, is accessible by water or private logging road. It has few services, but has a 30-minute hiking trail to an old homestead site. The homestead belonged to Helen and Armour Ford, who donated the land for the park to the province in 1974. Saint Andrew's Creek runs through the park, and is a fall spawning ground for coho salmon.

Name origin
The name of the park derives from local names conferred by an early Norwegian Canadian immigrant after his home village in the Eidfjord region of Norway.  The name means "waterfall in the valley".

Gallery

See also
List of British Columbia Provincial Parks

References

External links
BC Parks. Fossli Provincial Park

Provincial parks of British Columbia
Alberni Valley
1974 establishments in British Columbia
Protected areas established in 1974